Kouga may refer to:
 Kouga Local Municipality, a municipality in South Africa
 Kouga Mountains, a mountain range in South Africa
 Kouga River, a river in South Africa
 Kōga-ryū, often spelled Kouga-ryuu, a school of ninjutsu
 Koga (InuYasha), sometimes spelled Kouga, a character from the manga and anime series InuYasha
 Kouga, a set of characters in the novel The Kouga Ninja Scrolls

See also
 Koga (disambiguation)